Cranks was a chain of English wholefood vegetarian restaurants.  It was founded and owned by David and Kay Canter and Daphne Swann, and its flagship restaurant was at Marshall Street in the West End of London.

History
The first Cranks opened at 22 Carnaby Street, London, in 1961. In 1968 there were 16 vegetarian restaurants in London and 18 in the United Kingdom at the time. Although by no way the first vegetarian restaurant in the U.K. – Sir George Newnes, 1st Baronet opened a successful vegetarian restaurant in Manchester as early as the 1880s

In the 1950s, David Canter had become persuaded that good health depended on unrefined wholefoods and a vegetarian diet.  While he was converting premises in Carnaby Street for the Craft Potters Association (of which he was a co-founder), a vacant bakery came on to the market nearby and Canter decided to take it.  At that time Carnaby Street was, in Canter's words "not swinging, but a street of small shops and cafés." Canter, wife, Kay, and Swann borrowed £500 to start the restaurant.

The Cranks menu at first consisted mainly of salads.  David Canter wrote that, "In contrast to the traditional tired lettuce that makes the appetite wilt too, these salads could change the eater's whole view of vegetables.  The vivid combinations of ingredients and colours, crisp from cutting and dressing, were teamed with equally fresh wholemeal rolls, savouries and puddings." The restaurant became successful quickly, indicating unmet demand for its original menus.

The style of decor was also new, although owing something to 1950s coffee bars. There were solid natural-coloured oak tables, hand thrown stoneware pottery, heather-brown quarry tiles, woven basket lampshades and hand-woven seat covers.

Cranks moved to larger premises in Marshall Street in 1967.  In the next decade they opened branches at Dartmouth, Totnes, Guildford, Dartington, Heals furniture store in Tottenham Court Road, and the Peter Robinson department store in Oxford Street.  A sole franchise, the Cranks Grønne Buffet, was opened in Copenhagen.

David Canter died in 1981. In 1987 Kay Canter and Daphne Swann sold Cranks to 
Guinness. Opening more branches under a new business plan, the business encountered financial difficulties, attributed by some to a dated image. It was then bought and sold several times, and in the 1990s was rebranded, bringing it in line with contemporary sandwich bars. In 1998 it was bought by Capricorn International, who invested £1.5m in the London branches, but continuing losses forced them to close the restaurants.  The brand was then sold to Nando's Grocery Ltd.

Most of the Cranks restaurants closed in 2012 and an estimated 60 staff were made redundant.

Kay Canter died in April 2007 at age 85.
Daphne Swann died on 28 February 2020 at age 95.

The current owners have now agreed a sandwich distribution deal with Holland and Barrett in selected stores in London, and a frozen ready meal deal with Waitrose.

Cultural influence 
Cranks has been seen as a major factor in the spread of vegetarianism in recent decades. It attracted many celebrities who dined there, including Princess Diana, Sir Paul McCartney, Linda McCartney, and Sir Cliff Richard.

The Financial Times reported "Cranks restaurants and recipes popularised vegetarian food on the high street and in the home." In 2018, Bon Appétit journalist Julia Tausch called The Cranks Bible "the Only Vegetarian Cookbook I'll Ever Need."

Satirists and cultural critics called vegetarians "cranks" during the twentieth century but "In the 1960s, a vegetarian restaurant took the sting out of over a century of mockery by proudly adopting the name "Cranks"" reported the Cabinet Magazine. United States journalist Avery Yale Kamila of the Portland Press Herald reported Cranks is "credited with setting the tone for London’s current vibrant veg scene." Andrew Anthony of The Guardian reported about the mainstreaming of vegan food and reported "That old vegan profile ... has gone the way of Cranks restaurant and the cliche of nut roasts." The Guardian reported on the closing of the Food for Thought vegetarian restaurant and reported "Gradually, Covent Garden became a centre for alternative eating. On Marshall Street was Cranks, a little older and duller in its treatment of vegetarian food."

Nut roast 
The best-known Cranks dish was the nut roast and the Financial Times reported in 2021 "In the Cranks cookery book, nut roast is offered up as the veggie gateway drug." The recipe ingredients are one onion, butter or margarine, nuts, wholemeal bread, vegetable stock or water, yeast extract, mix herbs, salt and pepper. The Cranks nut roast was reported in 2021 to have inspired nut roasts eaten in the United States.

Books
David Canter, Kay Canter, Daphne Swann, The Cranks Recipe Book, Panther, 1982
Kay Canter and Daphne Swann, Entertaining With Cranks, Grafton Books, 1987
Daphne Swann, Cranks Puddings & Desserts, Guinness, 1987
Daphne Swann, Cranks Soups & Starters, Guinness,1987
Daphne Swann, Cranks Cakes & Biscuits, Gullane Children's Books, 1988
Daphne Swann, Cranks Breads & Teacakes, Guinness, 1988
David Canter, Cranks' Recipe Book, Orion, 1993
David Canter, Kay Canter, Daphne Swann, Traditional Vegetarian Cooking, Recipes from Europe's Famous Crank's Restaurant, Healing Art Press, 1991
Nadine Abensur, The Cranks Bible: A Timeless Collection of Vegetarian Recipes, 2002

See also
 List of vegetarian restaurants
Food for Thought

References

External links
Cranks.co.uk

Vegetarian restaurants in the United Kingdom
Defunct restaurants in London
Defunct vegetarian restaurants
Totnes
Restaurants in London
Restaurants in Devon